Persatuan Sepakbola Indonesia Pagardewa Bengkulu (simply known as Persipa Bengkulu) is an Indonesian football club based in Selebar, Bengkulu (city), Bengkulu. They currently compete in the Liga 3.

Honours
 Liga 3 Bengkulu
 Champion: 2019

References

External links
 Persipa Bengkulu Instagram
 Persipa Bengkulu Facebook

Bengkulu (city)
Football clubs in Indonesia
 Football clubs in Bengkulu